Midnight Beating is a 2010 Chinese horror film directed by Zhang Jiabei and starring Hong Kong veteran actors Simon Yam and Francis Ng.

Plot

In the Haibei People's Hospital, Qinghai province, China, the present day on the night of a full moon, a patient is murdered by a syringe through her chest. This adds stress to the hospital's heart surgeon Gu Zhensheng who had recently lost his wife Xia Xue (Liu Yuxin) to an illness. Since his wife's death, Gu has been suffering from nightmares that has affected his work, and Xia Xue's younger sister, Nurse Xia Xiaoyu (Yang Yuyu) also is emotionally disturbed.

The Hospital's director Wen Miao (Li Nian) is due for an operation for a weak heart. She's the fiancée of Mai Xiangyu (Francis Ng) the hospital's psychologist. Nurse Wu can't forgive Mai for breaking up with her and threatens to show his fiancée old photos of them having sex. One night, Wu is murdered in the same way as the old female patient. Gu tells hospital director Wen that Mai has been acting strangely lately, and Mai also tells him the same thing about Gu.

Cast

Release
Midnight Beating was released on December 24, 2010 in China. On its first week, Midnight Beating was the third highest-grossing film in China, being only beaten by If You Are the One 2 and Let the Bullets Fly. In total, the film grossed $4,731,045 in China.

Reception
Film Business Asia gave the film a five out of ten rating, who noted that the film is an "Okay hospital horror boasts good technique but is let down by a weak script."

References

External links
 
 Midnight Beating at Hong Kong Cinemagic

2010 films
Chinese horror films
2010 horror films
2010s Mandarin-language films